Boston Common is an American television sitcom created by David Kohan and Max Mutchnick, and aired on NBC from March 21, 1996, to April 27, 1997. The series was one of the 10 highest rated shows in its first season as it ranked 8th in the yearly ratings with a 15.6 household rating, but with a move to Sundays in its second season, the show dropped from 8th to 52nd place.

Plot
Boyd Pritchett is a genial, easy-going twenty-something from Virginia who delivers his sister Wyleen to college in Boston. Then Boyd falls in love with Joy and decides to stay, much to Wyleen's dismay. Boyd eventually gets a job at the college to help pay his sister's tuition and shares an apartment with Wyleen whose inclination is to be sexually active, but Boyd tries to inspire her with his chaste pursuit of Joy.

Characters

Main
 Anthony Clark as Boyd Pritchett
 Hedy Burress as Wyleen Pritchett
 Traylor Howard as Joy
 Tasha Smith as Tasha King
 Steve Paymer as Leonard Prince
 Vincent Ventresca as Professor Jack Reed
 Roger Rees as President Harrison Cross (season 2)

Recurring
 Sam Anderson as President Wesley Butterfield
 Margot Kidder as Cookie de Varen
 Zach Galifianakis as Bobby

Guest stars
 D.C. Douglas as D.C.
 Robin Duke as Brenda Nidorf
 Leah Lail as Anna
 Larry Miller as Warren
 Shelley Long as Louise Holmes

Episodes

Season 1 (1996)

Season 2 (1996–97)

External links
 

1996 American television series debuts
1997 American television series endings
1990s American college television series
1990s American romantic comedy television series
1990s American sitcoms
English-language television shows
NBC original programming
Television series by Castle Rock Entertainment
Television series by Sony Pictures Television
Television shows set in Boston